Ciro Ginestra (born 3 August 1978) is an Italian football manager and a former player.

A journeyman striker who has represented over 13 clubs in his career with most of his success in the third division of Italian football. He is known for his prowess in the area and has regularly scored goals in the lower levels of Italian football. Earlier in his career he represented the Italian national team under 21 level .

Career
Ginestra started his career at Serie D club Puteolana. In the summer of 1996, he was signed by Venezia, where he won promotion to Serie A 1998 as the runners up of Serie B. He did not feature often in Venezia's Serie A campaign and instead spent the next two seasons out on loan, first at SPAL and then at Ternana. While at SPAL he had a relatively successful campaign in the 1998–1999 season when he scored 10 goals in 33 league appearances. He returned to Veneziafrom his loan periods in January 2000, and played his first match in Serie A on 26 March 2000. At the end of the season, Venezia failed to maintain her Serie A status, and consequently Ginestra left the club to join Siena who were then in Serie B. In the middle of that season, after failing to maintain his place in the side, he joined Modena of Serie C1. The following season, he signed for Pistoiese of Serie B, but he again left mid-season for another third division club, this timePadova. After helping Padova reach the playoff semi-final in 2003, and narrowly missing out on promotion, he was re-signed by his old club Venezia, who were now back in Serie B. In January 2005, 6 months before Venezia went bankrupt, Ginestra re-signed for another of his old clubs Padova of the Serie C1.

This was only a short spell back at Padova as in the summer of 2005, Ginestra was signed by Frosinone and won Promotion from Serie C1 to Serie B via the playoffs. As he was not in the managers plans for Frosinone's Serie B campaign, he was allowed to join Perugia and so returned to Serie C1. After he scored 2 in the opening match of the Serie C1 2007–08 season, he was signed by Gallipoli who were also in the same division. In January 2010, he signed a 3-year contract with Crotone. This three-year contract was interrupted when in July 2011 he signed a 2-year contract with Sorrento. As of 15 December 2011 he has been an immediate success with the Rossoneri and has scored 13 goals in 22 games. This high scoring rate has seen Sorrento placed in the top half of the table for a second consecutive season where they are again pushing for Promotion to Serie B. On 3 August 2012 he moved on a free transfer to the Seconda Divisione club Salernitana.

Coaching career
He resigned as coach of the Serie C side Bisceglie on 7 December 2018.

On 6 June 2019 he was hired by Serie C club Casertana, signing a 2-year contract with the club holding an option to extend it for the third year. On 24 June 2020 his contract with Casertana was terminated.

On 16 September 2020 he joined Serie D club Picerno. He was sacked on 26 February 2021 due to poor results.

On 12 October 2021, Ginestra was appointed new head coach of Serie C club Fidelis Andria until the end of the season. He was relieved from his job on 1 February 2022 due to negative results.

Career statistics

Honours
Lega Pro Prima Divisione Champion: 2009

References

External links
http://aic.football.it/scheda/1893/ginestra-ciro.htm

1978 births
Living people
People from Pozzuoli
Italian footballers
Serie A players
Venezia F.C. players
S.P.A.L. players
Ternana Calcio players
A.C.N. Siena 1904 players
Modena F.C. players
U.S. Pistoiese 1921 players
Calcio Padova players
Frosinone Calcio players
A.C. Perugia Calcio players
A.S.D. Gallipoli Football 1909 players
F.C. Crotone players
A.S.D. Sorrento players
Association football forwards
Italian football managers
S.S. Fidelis Andria 1928 managers
Serie C managers
Sportspeople from the Province of Naples
Footballers from Campania